Ilsbo SK is a Swedish football club located in Ilsbo.

Background
Ilsbo SK currently plays in Division 4 Hälsingland which is the sixth tier of Swedish football. They play their home matches at the Ilsbo IP in Ilsbo.

The club is affiliated to Hälsinglands Fotbollförbund.

Season to season

In their most successful period Ilsbo SK competed in the following divisions:

In recent seasons Ilsbo SK have competed in the following divisions:

Footnotes

External links
 Ilsbo SK – Official website

Sport in Gävleborg County
Football clubs in Gävleborg County
1933 establishments in Sweden